Bryntirion, Laleston & Merthyr Mawr is one of the larger electoral wards of Bridgend County Borough, Wales. It covers the community of Merthyr Mawr and most of the neighbouring community of Laleston, which includes the village of the same name and the Bridgend suburb of Bryntirion. The ward elects two county councillors to the Bridgend County Borough Council.

The ward was created by The County Borough of Bridgend (Electoral Arrangements) Order 1998 effective for the preparation for the May 1999 council elections.

According to the 2011 census the population of the ward was 8,713.

County councillors
Recent elections have been competitive between the different political parties.

See also
 List of electoral wards in Bridgend County Borough

References

1998 establishments in Wales
Bridgend
Wards of Bridgend County Borough